Palaiopyrgos is a village and a community of the Agia municipality. Before the 2011 local government reform it was a part of the municipality of Evrymenes. The 2011 census recorded 161 inhabitants in the village and 244 in the community. The community of Palaiopyrgos covers an area of 11.678 km2.

Administrative division
The community of Palaiopyrgos consists of three separate settlements: 
Alexandrini (population 83)
Palaiopyrgos  (population 161)
Strintzios (uninhabited)

Geography
The village is located on a plain run by Pineios river, located between Mount Ossa, and Mount Olympus.

Population
According to the 2011 census, the population of the settlement of Palaiopyrgos was 161 people, a decrease of almost 14% compared with the population of the previous census of 2001.

See also
 List of settlements in the Larissa regional unit

References

Populated places in Larissa (regional unit)